Kaarlo is a Finnish given name. Notable people with the name include:

Kaarlo Bergbom (1843–1906), Finnish theatre director
Kaarlo Blomstedt (1880–1949), Finnish historian and archivist
Kaarlo Castrén (1860–1938), Prime Minister of Finland
Kaarlo Edvard Kivekäs (1866–1940), Finnish general
Kaarlo Ekholm (1884–1946), Finnish gymnast who competed in the 1912 Summer Olympics
Kaarlo Halttunen (1909–1986), Finnish actor
Kaarlo Harvala (1885–1942), Finnish journalist and politician 
Kaarlo Heiskanen (1894–1962), Finnish general and Knight of the Mannerheim Cross
Kaarlo Juho Ståhlberg (1865–1952), Finnish jurist and academic
Kaarlo Kangasniemi (born 1941), former Finnish weightlifter
Kaarlo Koskelo (1888–1953), Finnish wrestler who competed in the 1912 Summer Olympics
Kaarlo "Kalle" Kustaa Paasia (1883–1961), Finnish gymnast who competed in the 1908 Summer Olympics
Kaarlo Leinonen (1914–1975), Finnish general and Minister of Defence
Kaarlo Linkola (born Collan) (1888–1942), Finnish botanist and phytogeographer
Kaarlo Mäkinen (1892–1980), Finnish freestyle wrestler and Olympic champion
Kaarlo Maaninka (born 1953), former Finnish long-distance runner
Kaarlo Rantanen (born 1988), Finnish football player 
Kaarlo Sarkia (1902–1945), Finnish poet
Kaarlo Soinio (1888–1960), Finnish gymnast and amateur football (soccer) player
Kaarlo Tuominen (1908–2006), Finnish steeplechase runner
Kaarlo Uskela (1878–1922), Finnish writer, poet and anarchist
Kaarlo Vähämäki (born 1892), Finnish gymnast who competed in the 1912 Summer Olympics
Kaarlo Väkevä (1909–1932), Finnish boxer who competed in the 1928 Summer Olympics
Kaarlo Vasama (1885–1926), Finnish gymnast who competed in the 1912 Summer Olympics
Kaarlo Wirilander (1908–1988), Finnish historian

See also

Kaarle

References

Finnish masculine given names